

Partisan identification in the electorate
 the Pennsylvania Department of State reports that there are approximately 4,000,000 (46%) registered Democrats, 3,450,000 (39%) registered Republicans, 911,000 (10%) registered unaffiliated, and 377,000 (4%) registered with other parties.

Partisan affiliation of elected officials
The following table indicates the party of elected officials in the U.S. state of Pennsylvania:
 Governor
 Lieutenant Governor
 Attorney General
 State Auditor General
 State Treasurer

The table also indicates the historical party composition in the:
 State Senate
 State House of Representatives
 State delegation to the United States Senate
 State delegation to the United States House of Representatives

Pennsylvania currently has 20 electoral votes, as per the 2010 Census, based on their 18 seats in the United States House of Representatives and 2 United States Senators. The table below indicates which party's nominees received the state's electoral votes for the years in which a presidential election was held.  

Following the 2020 Census, Pennsylvania lost one seat in the House of Representatives.  As a result, starting with the general election of 2022 Pennsylvania will only send 17 members to the House.  This also means that in the general election of 2024 Pennsylvania will have 19 electoral votes.

1777–1790

1791–1872

1873–1978

1978–present

See also
 Democratic Party of Pennsylvania
 Elections in Pennsylvania
 Green Party of Pennsylvania
 Libertarian Party of Pennsylvania
 Politics of Pennsylvania
 Republican Party of Pennsylvania

References

Politics of Pennsylvania
Government of Pennsylvania
Pennsylvania